East Star Airlines was an airline based in Wuhan, Hubei, People's Republic of China.

East Star may also refer to:

A single co-produced by Missrepresent
SS East Star, Canada

See also
Middle East Star of Midwest Radio Network
 Eastar (disambiguation)
 Eastern Star (disambiguation)